Muḥammad ibn 'Abd al-Mu'īn ibn 'Awn (1767 –  29 March 1858), also known as Muhammad ibn Awn, was Sharif and Emir of Mecca from 1827 to 1851 and 1856 to 1858.

Family
He was the son of Sharif 'Abdu'l Muin bin 'Aun.

Emirate
He was appointed to the Emirate in 1827 by Muhammad Ali Pasha, the ruler of Egypt. He was the first Emir of Mecca from the Abdillahis – the clan descending from his 6th generation ancestor Abd Allah ibn Hasan.

Death and burial
He died on 13 Sha'ban 1274 AH (c. 29 March 1858) after an illness. He was buried in the qubbah (tomb-building) of Aminah bint Wahb, next to her grave.

Issue
He had six sons:
 Abdullah
 Ali (father of Hussein bin Ali, Sharif of Mecca)
 Husayn
 Awn ar-Rafiq
 Sultan
 Abd al-Ilah

He also had four daughters.

Notes

References
 
 

1767 births
1858 deaths
18th-century Arabs
19th-century Arabs
Sharifs of Mecca
Dhawu Awn